Legal High is a 2016 novel by German author . Originally written in the German language, it is a social satire concerning a near-future Germany where a legalization of cannabis is imminent. The novel's protagonist, der Dude, is based on a German cannabis grower with whom Schmidt became acquainted while doing journalism research.

Reception
Critics called the book a parody of political and economic strategies in Doppelmoral in den Hinterzimmern der Macht ("hypocrisy in the backrooms of power"), asking questions about the winners and losers of the "U-turn" on cannabis. A German business magazine included it in a review of several books concerning legalization, noting its clever examination of the schwerwiegende Auswirkungen (serious impact) where it has already occurred, such as the U.S. state of Colorado. The novel was referred to in a pro-legalization op-ed in Die Welt by Cem Özdemir, the co-chair of Alliance 90/The Greens.

See also
 List of books about cannabis

References

Further reading

External links
 Publisher info (Rowohlt)
 

2016 German novels
Fiction set in 2018
Fiction books about cannabis
Satirical novels
2016 speculative fiction novels
German works about cannabis
Rowohlt Verlag books